The 2009 Open GDF Suez was a women's professional tennis tournament played on indoor hardcourts. It was the 17th edition of the Open GDF Suez (formerly known as the Open Gaz de France) and was a Premier tournament on the 2009 WTA Tour. It took place at Stade Pierre de Coubertin in Paris, France, from 9 February until 15 February 2009.

The top three seeds were Serena Williams, the 2009 Australian Open singles champion and twice the winner of this event, Jelena Janković, a former World No. 1, and Elena Dementieva, the 2008 Olympic gold medalist in singles and a 2009 Australian Open semifinalist. Agnieszka Radwańska, home favourite Alizé Cornet, Patty Schnyder, Anabel Medina Garrigues, and two-time champion Amélie Mauresmo also played this event.

Entrants

Seeds
  
Maria Sharapova was initially set to make her season debut here after sitting out several months with a shoulder injury. However, she eventually withdrew. She was replaced by Jelena Janković. Katarina Srebotnik also withdrew from the event with an ongoing injury.

Rankings as of February 9, 2009.

Other entrants
The following players received wildcards into the main draw:

 Jelena Janković
 Daniela Hantuchová
 Virginie Razzano
 Nathalie Dechy

The following players received entry from the qualifying draw:

 Émilie Loit
 Karolina Šprem
 Oxana Lyubtsova
 Anastasija Sevastova

Prize money & points
The total prize money for the tournament was US$700,000, upgraded from the previous year's US$600,000.

Total prize money: US$700,000

Finals

Singles

 Amélie Mauresmo defeated  Elena Dementieva 7–6(7), 2–6, 6–4
It was Mauresmo's only title of the year and 25th and last of her career. It was her 3rd win at the event, also winning in 2001 and 2006.

Doubles

 Cara Black /  Liezel Huber defeated  Květa Peschke /  
Lisa Raymond 6–4, 3–6, [10–4]

References

External links
Official website

Open GDF Suez
Open GDF Suez
Open GDF Suez
Open GDF Suez
Open Gaz de France
Open GDF Suez